Castel Rigone Calcio was an Italian association football club, based in Castel Rigone, a frazione of Passignano sul Trasimeno, Umbria. Castel Rigone last played in Lega Pro Seconda Divisione.

History
The club was founded in 1998. In 2002 it was promoted from Terza Categoria Umbra, the lowest league in its region, to Eccellenza Umbra in just 4 years through 4 successive championships. In 2009 it was promoted to Serie D as runners-up and Coppa Umbria Eccellenza winners. In 2013 it was promoted (as Group E champions) to Lega Pro Seconda Divisione for the first and only venture in the pros, but ended second from bottom at season's end. However, it refused to return to Serie D and was excluded, closing the senior side. It now handles only youth football.

Colors and badge 
The team's colors were white and blue.

References

External links
Official Website

Football clubs in Umbria
Association football clubs established in 1998
1998 establishments in Italy
Association football clubs disestablished in 2014
2014 disestablishments in Italy

Serie C clubs
Defunct football clubs in Italy